Gelzer may refer to:

Heinrich Gelzer (1847–1906), German classical scholar and writer on Armenian mythology
Jay Gelzer (1889–1964), American writer
Johann Heinrich Gelzer (1813–1889), Swiss historian and diplomat, father of Heinrich Gelzer
Matthias Gelzer (1886–1974), a Swiss-German classical historian, known for his studies of the Roman Republic

See also